William A. Bloom (born December 10, 1948) is an American songwriter and musician.

Bloom was a staff writer and producer for Philadelphia International Records and WMOT Records.  He co-wrote and produced the album Children of Tomorrow by Frankie Smith, including the 1981 hit song "Double Dutch Bus".

References

External links 
Official Website
Bill Bloom interview on BMI website
Double Dutch Bus Blog

1948 births
Living people
American male songwriters